"He's Back (The Man Behind the Mask)" is a song by American shock rock musician Alice Cooper. It was released as the lead single from his 1986 album Constrictor, and the theme song of Friday the 13th Part VI: Jason Lives, a slasher film and sixth part of the Friday the 13th film series released in the same year. The song is heard various times throughout the film and in the end credits. Two other songs, "Teenage Frankenstein" (also from Constrictor) and "Hard Rock Summer" (which remained commercially unreleased until its inclusion on The Life and Crimes of Alice Cooper in 1999) are also featured in the film.

The song features the famous "ki-ki-ki ma-ma-ma" (in its popular misheard version, "ch-ch-ch, ha-ha-ha") sound effect, a trademark of the Friday the 13th series.

"He's Back (The Man Behind the Mask)" was a minor chart success, popular among fans of Cooper's later work and enthusiasts of slasher films. It has been called "strangely new wave-ish" and said to "perfectly enscapulate the Friday the 13th films and the era in which they came to prominence."

The 7" single featured a "live" version of "Billion Dollar Babies" as its B-side. The 12" single featured "Billion Dollar Babies (Recorded Live)" as well as a haunting "live" version of "I'm Eighteen". Both versions were in fact originally recorded in the studio for the Alice Cooper a Paris TV special in 1982 during the Special Forces era, which were remixed in 1986 with crowd noise to resemble "live" recordings.

Other versions
A demo version of the song, with a slightly rockier and much more upbeat feel, as well as the final release version, were featured in the four-disc retrospective boxed set The Life and Crimes of Alice Cooper, which chronicles Cooper's career. The song was also available on a compilation album of songs from his two late-1980s MCA albums, Constrictor and Raise Your Fist and Yell, entitled Prince of Darkness.

The unused demo version instead became the song Trick Bag, also on the Constrictor album.

Music video
The song is well known for its music video, which combines clips from Jason Lives with original footage featuring Cooper performing the song and Jason Voorhees played, as he is in the film, by C. J. Graham menacing teenagers at a midnight showing of Jason Lives. It was directed by Jeffrey Abelson from a concept by Keith Williams. Some of the film footage features the Paintball scene where Jason was played by Dan Bradley, which was filmed before he was replaced by Graham. This video was not present on any home media  release until 2020 when Shout Factory's line Scream Factory released it as a bonus feature on their Friday the 13th deluxe box set.

Track listing
7" single

12" single

In other media
A reference to the song is made in the 2005 Friday the 13th tie-in novel Friday the 13th: Hate-Kill-Repeat; while attending a party, a character notices that the song being played is by Alice Cooper and that the premise of it involves "something about a man behind a mask".

The song is also heard in the credits sequence in Friday the 13th: The Game.

Charts

Cover versions
The song has been covered by some other artists. Finnish metal band Children of Bodom recorded a version in 2002, but was never released, and "He's Back" has been performed live by another Finnish metal band, Lordi. In addition, the song was covered by One Man Army and the Undead Quartet, which was released on the Swedish death metal group's 2007 album Error in Evolution.

References

External links
[ Constrictor] at Allmusic

1986 singles
Songs written by Tom Kelly (musician)
Songs written by Alice Cooper
Alice Cooper songs
Friday the 13th (franchise) music
Songs written for films
American new wave songs
Songs written by Kane Roberts
MCA Records singles